Moral Essays (also known as Epistles to Several Persons) is a series of four poems on ethical subjects by Alexander Pope, published between 1731 and 1735. The individual poems are:

Epistle to Cobham (1734, addressed to Sir Richard Temple, Lord Cobham), "Of the Knowledge and Characters of Men"
Epistle to a Lady (1735, addressed to Martha Blount), "Of the Characters of Women"
Epistle to Bathurst (1733, addressed to Allen, Lord Bathurst), "Of the Use of Riches"
Epistle to Burlington (1731, addressed to Richard Boyle, Earl of Burlington), "Of False Taste"

References

Ian Gordon. "Moral Essays." The Literary Encyclopedia. 24 Jan. 2002. Accessed 1 April 2008.<http://www.litencyc.com/php/sworks.php?rec=true&UID=3487>

Works by Alexander Pope